Adventist Health Community Care-Hanford (formerly Central Valley General Hospital) is a clinic in Hanford, California.  It offers extensive Community Care clinic services serving communities in Kings, Tulare and southern Fresno counties.  Adventist Health Community Care-Hanford is a part of a division of Adventist Health known as the "Adventist Health/Central Valley Network," Adventist Health Hanford, Adventist Health Selma, Adventist Health Reedley, and over 42 Adventist Health/Community Care clinics throughout a  region in the Central Valley.

History
In 1998, Adventist Health’s growth in the San Joaquin Valley surged with the purchase of Central Valley General Hospital, formerly called Sacred Heart Hospital, in Hanford. A year later, Adventist Health purchased Selma Community Hospital, about 15 miles north of Hanford. Central Valley General Hospital and Selma Community Hospital also began opening rural health clinics to improve rural patients’ access to health care in the region.

In 2005, the hospital licenses of Hanford Community and Selma Community were combined, and Central Valley General Hospital took over the Selma Community clinics to consolidate operations among the three hospitals in an effort to improve access, quality and strength.

The local network now offers forty-two Adventist Health/Community Care clinic sites in Kings County, Fresno County, Tulare County, Kern County & Madera as well as physical therapy centers, a Sleep Apnea Center and many other services in the  region.

On March 7, 2016, the labor and deliver services moved to the new Family Birth Center at Adventist Medical Center – Hanford on Mall Drive. The birth center is a $44 million state-of-the-art facility that focuses on patient experience. It features 11 private labor and delivery rooms, two surgery suites, a six-bed neonatal intensive care unit operated by Valley Children's Healthcare, 16 postpartum rooms, a café, gift shop and more.

With this move, Central Valley General hospital is no longer an inpatient hospital, and was renamed Adventist Health Community Care - Hanford. The six clinic services remain at the campus, including Community Care – Hanford primary care, Behavioral Health, Dental, Family Medicine Residency, Healthy Beginnings and Specialty.

Affiliation
Adventist Health Community Care-Hanford is part of Adventist Health, a faith-based, nonprofit integrated health delivery system serving communities in California, Hawaii and Oregon. Founded on Seventh-day Adventist heritage and values, Adventist Health provides compassionate community care. Other Adventist Health entities include, 20 hospitals with more than 2,890 beds, more than 275 clinics (hospital-based, rural health and physician clinics), 15 home care agencies and seven hospice agencies, four joint-venture retirement centers and a workforce of 31,000 includes more than 22,350 employees; 4,800 medical staff physicians; and 3,850 volunteers.

In the news
July 27, 2009—Hanford Sentinel--"Adventist Health wins workability award"

References

External links
 http://www.AdventistHealthCV.com/
 This hospital in the CA Healthcare Atlas A project by OSHPD

See also

 List of Seventh-day Adventist hospitals
 List of Seventh-day Adventist medical schools
 List of Seventh-day Adventist secondary schools
 List of Seventh-day Adventist colleges and universities
 Seventh-day Adventist Church
 Seventh-day Adventist theology
 History of the Seventh-day Adventist Church
 List of hospitals in California
Adventist Health
Adventist Health International
Adventist Health Studies
 AdventHealth
 Adventist HealthCare

Buildings and structures in Kings County, California
Adventist Health
Hanford, California
Clinics in California